The Chief Justice of South Africa is the most senior judge of the Constitutional Court and head of the judiciary of South Africa, who exercises final authority over the functioning and management of all the courts.

The position of Chief Justice was created upon the formation of the Union of South Africa in 1910, with the Chief Justice of the Cape Colony, Sir (John) Henry de Villiers (later created The 1st Baron de Villiers), being appointed the first Chief Justice of the newly created Appellate Division of the Supreme Court of South Africa.

Until 1961, the Chief Justice held a dormant commission as Officer Administering the Government, meaning that if the Governor-General died or was incapacitated the Chief Justice would exercise the powers and duties of the Governor-General. This commission was invoked in 1943 under N.J. de Wet, and in 1959 and 1961 under L.C. Steyn.

History and creation of the post

The position of Chief Justice as it stands today was created in 2001 by the Sixth Amendment of the Constitution of South Africa, as an amalgamation of two previous high-ranking judicial positions of Chief Justice and President of the Constitutional Court. The Chief Justice therefore now presides over the Constitutional Court. The position of the presiding judge of the Supreme Court of Appeal of South Africa, the successor court to the Appellate Division, was as a consequence renamed President of the Supreme Court of Appeal.

Chief Justice in a new era

At the time of South Africa's democratisation in the early 1990s, the position of Chief Justice was held by University of Cambridge graduate and Second World War veteran Michael Corbett. Corbett took office in 1989, succeeding Chief Justice P.J. Rabie, who had been scheduled to retire in 1986 at the statutory retirement age of 70, but had had his tenure in office extended on an ad hoc basis by State President P.W. Botha.

However, with the fall of Apartheid imminent, the progressively-minded Corbett was eventually handed the job of Chief Justice in 1989. Although appointed by the National Party government, Corbett was generally well liked by those in South Africa's new African National Congress (ANC)-led government, and upon his retirement in 1996 was given a formal state banquet where President Mandela paid tribute to the Chief Justice's "passion for justice", "sensitivity to racial discrimination", "intellectual rigour" and "clarity of thought".

The first Chief Justice to be appointed in post-apartheid South Africa was Ismail Mahomed, a leading South African jurist of Indian descent, who was selected to succeed Corbett in 1997 and eventually took office in 1998. Mahomed held the position until his death in 2000.

Under South Africa's Interim Constitution of 1993 and later the Final Constitution, the importance of the position of Chief Justice as the position of final judicial authority was temporarily relegated beneath that of the President of the newly created Constitutional Court. Ismail Mohammed had been tipped widely for the job of Constitutional Court President but in 1994, President Nelson Mandela appointed leading human rights lawyer and director of the Legal Resources Centre Arthur Chaskalson to the position. In 2001, after Mohammed's death and, consequently, with the position of Chief Justice vacant, the Sixth Amendment of the Constitution of South Africa fused the positions of Chief Justice and President of the Constitutional Court into one single job of Chief Justice. Chaskalson was subsequently appointed to the new post, although his tasks remained effectively the same.

Chief justices of Cape Colony

Source:
1812– Sir Johannes Andries Truter (Vice-Admiralty Court)
1827–1855 Sir John Wylde
*1828 Supreme Court established
1855–1858 Sir Sidney Smith Bell (acting)
1858–1868 Sir William Hodges
1868–1874 Sir Sidney Smith Bell
1874–1910 John de Villiers, 1st Baron de Villiers

Chief justices of Natal (1856–1910)

 1858–1874 Walter Harding
 1874–1890 Sir Henry Connor
 1890–1901 Michael Henry Gallwey
 1901–1910 Sir Henry Bale (died 1910)

Chief justices of Orange Free State (1875–1919)

 1874–1888 Francis William Reitz
 1889–1900 Melius de Villiers
 1902–1919 Sir Andries Maasdorp (Orange River Colony)

Chief justices of Transvaal (1877-1910)

 1881– John Gilbert Kotzé
 1898– Reinhold Gregorowsky
 1902–1910 James Rose Innes (Transvaal Colony)

Chief justices of South Africa

1910–1914 The 1st Baron de Villiers
1914–1927 Sir James Rose Innes
1927–1929 Sir William Henry Solomon
1929–1932 Jacob de Villiers
1932–1936 Sir John Wessels
1936–1938 John Stephen Curlewis
1938–1939 James Stratford
1939–1943 Nicolaas Jacobus de Wet
1943–1950 Ernest Frederick Watermeyer
1950–1957 Albert van der Sandt Centlivres
1957–1959 Henry Allan Fagan
1959–1971 Lucas Cornelius Steyn
1971–1974 Newton Ogilvie Thompson
1974–1982 Frans Lourens Herman Rumpff
1982–1989 Pieter Jacobus Rabie
1989–1996 Michael Corbett
1998–2000 Ismail Mahomed
2001–2005 Arthur Chaskalson
2005–2009 Pius Langa
2009–2011 Sandile Ngcobo
2011–2021 Mogoeng Mogoeng
2022– Ray Zondo

See also

Constitutional Court of South Africa
Constitution of South Africa

References

External links

Office of the Chief Justice

 
Judiciary of South Africa
Constitutional Court of South Africa
South Africa and the Commonwealth of Nations